Kristina Holland (born February 25, 1944) is an American actress who has performed in more than 22 television series, two films, and voiceover talent for at least two video games. She is now a professional psychotherapist.

She is perhaps best known for her recurring role as Tina Rickles, secretary to Tom Corbett (Bill Bixby) in the TV series The Courtship of Eddie's Father. She was the voice of April Stewart in the animated series The Funky Phantom, the voice of Stephanie in the animated series Butch Cassidy and the Sundance Kids and the voice of Alice Boyle in the animated series Wait Till Your Father Gets Home.

Life and career
Holland was born in Fayetteville, North Carolina. She has been a practicing psychologist since 2000.

References

External links

1944 births
Living people
American television actresses
American film actresses
American video game actresses
American voice actresses
American psychotherapists
People from Fayetteville, North Carolina
Actresses from North Carolina
21st-century American women